George Bryan Porter (February 9, 1791 – July 6, 1834) was an American statesman in Pennsylvania and Territorial governor of Michigan from August 6, 1831, until his death on July 6, 1834.

Early life
Born in Norristown, Pennsylvania, Porter attended the Norristown Academy. While he and his two brothers were preparing to enter college, there was a student "rebellion" at Princeton University and many school buildings had been burned. As a result, Porter and his brothers continued their studies in their father's library rather than at Princeton.

Career
Porter was a major in the United States Army during the War of 1812. He attended Litchfield Law School in Litchfield, Connecticut, and was admitted to the bar in Lancaster County, Pennsylvania, in 1813. He served as Prothonotary (Chief Court Clerk) in Lancaster County, Pennsylvania, in 1818.

A lawyer in Lancaster, Lancaster County, Pennsylvania, Porter eventually entered state politics. He served as Adjutant General from 1824 to 1829; became a Democratic party member of the Pennsylvania House of Representatives in 1827.

Porter was United States Marshall for the Eastern District of Pennsylvania in 1831. Appointed by President Andrew Jackson in 1831, Porter served as the Territorial Governor of Michigan from 1832 until his death in 1834. In this role he accompanied Oneida chief Daniel Bread to the White House to ask President Jackson for  alternative land arrangements for the Oneida in response to the 1831 Treaty of Washington, which along with the 1927 Treaty of Butte Morts  had reduced Oneida lands by 90%. The trip was successful in that the president agreed to exchange Oneida lands for "better, more fertile" lands.

Death
Porter died while in office on July 6, 1834, during a cholera epidemic in Detroit, Michigan. He is interred at Elmwood Cemetery in Detroit.

A portrait of Porter was unveiled in November 2015 and hangs on the second floor of the Michigan State Capitol in Lansing.

Family life
Porter married Sarah Humes of Pennsylvania on October 31, 1816, and had at least four children, one of whom was General Andrew Porter, one of the generals at the First Battle of Bull Run, who married Margarite Biddle of the famous Biddle family.

Porter was the son of Andrew Porter who served in the U.S. Revolutionary War, and Elizabeth Parker Porter. He was also the brother of David Rittenhouse Porter, Pennsylvania Governor 1839–1845, and James Madison Porter, Secretary of War 1843–1844, and the uncle of Horace Porter, U.S. Ambassador to France 1897–1905.

References

External links

1791 births
1834 deaths
People from Norristown, Pennsylvania
Politicians from Detroit
Deaths from cholera
Governors of Michigan Territory
Democratic Party members of the Pennsylvania House of Representatives
Burials at Elmwood Cemetery (Detroit)
Infectious disease deaths in Michigan
Porter family
19th-century American politicians
United States Army personnel of the War of 1812
United States Army officers